Stogovci may refer to several places in Slovenia: 

Stogovci, Apače, a settlement in the Municipality of Apače
Stogovci, Majšperk, a settlement in the Municipality of Majšperk